Gianni Ghidini  (21 May 1930 – 20 June 1995) was a road racing cyclist from Italy. He won the silver medal in the men's team road race, alongside Dino Bruni and Vincenzo Zucconelli. Italy's fourth rider Bruno Monti also crossed the line, but didn't receive a medal because just the first three counted for the final classification. He was a professional rider from 1953 to 1956.

References

External links
 
 

1930 births
1995 deaths
Italian male cyclists
Cyclists at the 1952 Summer Olympics
Olympic cyclists of Italy
Olympic silver medalists for Italy
Sportspeople from Parma
Olympic medalists in cycling
Medalists at the 1952 Summer Olympics
Cyclists from Emilia-Romagna
20th-century Italian people